A. J. I. Senior Secondary School is a school in Nayabazar, Uppala, Kasaragod district, Kerala, India. Uppala is a town located midway between Kumbala and Manjeshwaram, north of the town of Kasaragod.

The president of Aji Senior Secondary School is Mr. P.K. Moosa.

References

External links 

Schools in Kasaragod district